Tom Secco is a former collegiate head men's soccer coach. He's best known for serving as the head soccer coach at DePaul University from 1999 to 2000, compiling an 8–24 record. He had previously served at Triton Junior College in River Grove, Illinois. He posted a 108-10-2 record in seven seasons there. He also served as the head men's soccer coach of the Chicago Kickers from 1984 to 1991.

External links
http://conferenceusa.cstv.com/sports/m-soccer/spec-rel/062100aaa.html

DePaul Blue Demons men's soccer coaches
Living people
Year of birth missing (living people)